Devonte' Terrell Graham (born February 22, 1995) is an American professional basketball player for the San Antonio Spurs of the National Basketball Association (NBA). He played college basketball for the Kansas Jayhawks.

High school career
Graham attended Broughton High School in Raleigh, North Carolina. As a senior, Graham averaged 15.7 points and 5.4 assists per game, leading the team to a 26–6 record and the 4A state championship game during the 2012–13 season. 

Graham originally committed to Appalachian State before deciding he wanted to play elsewhere. However, Appalachian State’s head coach at the time, Jason Capel, would not allow him to de-commit, as he felt other teams may have been tampering with Graham following his commitment to the university. Due to this, Graham elected to play a post-graduate year at Brewster Academy, in Wolfeboro, New Hampshire, rather than honor his commitment to play for Appalachian State.

At Brewster Academy, Graham averaged 17.2 points and 5.0 assists per game, leading the team to the national prep championship and the New England championship during the 2013–14 season. On May 2, 2014, Graham committed to Kansas, choosing them over North Carolina and Virginia.

College career

Freshman
As a freshman at Kansas, Graham averaged 5.7 points and 2.1 assists per game. He had a season-high 20 points against TCU on February 21, 2015. In the NCAA Tournament, he scored 17 points against Wichita State.

Sophomore
After scoring a then career-high 27 points on 8-of-13 shooting against Oklahoma, Graham was named Big 12 Player of the Week for the week of February 14, 2016. At the conclusion of the regular season, Graham was named to the Big 12 All-Defensive Team. He was named MVP of the 2016 Big 12 men's basketball tournament after scoring 27 points against West Virginia in the championship game. As a sophomore in the 2015–16 season, Graham averaged 11.3 points per game while shooting 46 percent overall and 44 percent from 3 point territory.

Junior
As a junior, Graham was named to the Second Team All-Big 12. Along with Frank Mason III, Graham formed the backcourt of a Kansas team that went 31–5 but lost in the Elite Eight, as Graham shot 0 for 7 from the field and missed six 3-pointers in a season-ending 74–60 loss to Oregon. For the season, he averaged 13.4 points, 4.1 assists and 3.1 rebounds per game. In April, Graham announced on Twitter that he was returning for his senior year.

Senior
In his senior season, Graham was named the preseason Big 12 Player of the Year for the 2017–18 season. On November 28, Graham scored a career high 35 points in a 96–58 win over Toledo. The following game, a 76–60 win over Syracuse, Graham again scored 35 points. Graham would go on to be unanimously selected as the Big 12 Player of the Year, averaging 17.6 points and 7.2 assists per game as a senior. He was also named a consensus member of the First Team All-America by multiple organizations, leading his team to the 2017-18 Final Four in San Antonio, Texas. During his senior season, he averaged about 38 minutes a game.

Professional career

Charlotte Hornets (2018–2021)
Graham was drafted in the 2nd round, 34th overall, of the 2018 NBA draft by the Atlanta Hawks before being traded to the Charlotte Hornets in exchange for two second round picks. In the Hornets' first three summer league games, he averaged ten points and six assists per contest. However, he would miss the rest of summer league with a knee injury. Graham made his NBA debut on October 22, 2018, against the Toronto Raptors, recording no points and one assist in five and a half minutes of play. 

On October 23, 2019, Graham scored 23 points along with eight assists and four rebounds in a 126–125 win over the Chicago Bulls. Graham hit six three-pointers to help the Hornets set a new franchise record for three-point field goals made in a single game. On December 11, 2019, Graham scored a career-high 40 points with five rebounds and five assists in a 113–108 win over the Brooklyn Nets.

Graham was featured on The Dodo's Youtube channel in June 2021, in a video about his basketball career and his life with his German Shepherd dog 'Charlotte', who is named after the team he had been playing for.

New Orleans Pelicans (2021–2023)
On August 7, 2021, Graham was traded to the New Orleans Pelicans in a three-team trade involving the Memphis Grizzlies. He made his Pelicans debut on October 20, recording 18 points and five assists in a 117–97 loss to the Philadelphia 76ers. On November 26, Graham hit a game-winning three-pointer with 1.9 seconds left to give the Pelicans a 98–97 win over the Utah Jazz. On December 15, he hit a 61-foot, buzzer-beating shot to hoist the Pelicans to a 113–110 win over the Oklahoma City Thunder. The shot set the NBA record for the longest buzzer-beating game-winner in league history, beating out Mahmoud Abdul-Rauf's 55-foot shot in 1992 for the Denver Nuggets. On March 24, 2022, Graham scored a season-high 30 points, alongside two rebounds and four assists, in a 126–109 win over the Chicago Bulls. After a set of play-in tournament wins, the Pelicans qualified for the playoffs for the first time since 2018 and faced the Phoenix Suns during their first-round series. Graham made his playoff debut on April 17, playing ten minutes in a 110–99 Game 1 loss.

San Antonio Spurs (2023–present)
On February 9, 2023, Graham was traded, alongside four second-round picks, to the San Antonio Spurs in exchange for Josh Richardson. Graham made his Spurs debut a day later, recording a season-high 31 points, three rebounds and three assists in a 138–131 double overtime loss to the Detroit Pistons. Graham's 31 points were also the most points scored in a debut in Spurs history.

Career statistics

NBA

Regular season

|-
| style="text-align:left;"| 
| style="text-align:left;"| Charlotte
| 46 || 3 || 14.7|| .343 || .281 || .761 || 1.4 || 2.6 || .5 || .0 || 4.7
|-
| style="text-align:left;"| 
| style="text-align:left;"| Charlotte
| 63 || 53 || 35.1 || .382 || .373 || .820 || 3.4 || 7.5 || 1.0 || .2 || 18.2
|-
| style="text-align:left;"| 
| style="text-align:left;"| Charlotte
| 55 || 44 || 30.2 || .377 || .375 || .842 || 2.7 || 5.4 || .9 || .1 || 14.8
|-
| style="text-align:left;"| 
| style="text-align:left;"| New Orleans
| 76 || 63 || 28.4 || .363 || .341 || .843 || 2.3 || 4.2 || .9 || .2 || 11.9
|-
| style="text-align:left;"| 
| style="text-align:left;"| New Orleans
| 53 || 0 || 15.3 || .368 || .347 || .746 || 1.4 || 2.2 || .6 || .2 || 5.3
|- class="sortbottom"
| style="text-align:center;" colspan="2"| Career
| 293 || 163 || 25.7 || .371 || .356 || .819 || 2.3 || 4.5 || .8 || .2 || 11.5

Playoffs

|-
| style="text-align:left;"|2022
| style="text-align:left;"|New Orleans
| 6 || 0 || 10.0 || .333 || .357 || .875 || 1.5 || .7 || .2 || .2 || 4.0
|- class="sortbottom"
| style="text-align:center;" colspan="2"|Career
| 6 || 0 || 10.0 || .333 || .357 || .875 || 1.5 || .7 || .2 || .2 || 4.0

College

|-
| style="text-align:left;"| 2014–15
| style="text-align:left;"| Kansas
| 29 || 0 || 17.8 || .393 || .425|| .724 || 1.5 || 2.1 || 0.9 || 0.0 || 5.7
|-
| style="text-align:left;"| 2015–16
| style="text-align:left;"| Kansas
| 38 || 36 || 32.6 || .460 || .441 || .744 || 3.3 || 3.7|| 1.4 || 0.1 ||11.3
|-
| style="text-align:left;"| 2016–17
| style="text-align:left;"| Kansas
| 36 || 36 || 35.3 || .428  || .388 || .793 || 3.1 || 4.1 || 1.5 || 0.2 || 13.4
|-
| style="text-align:left;"| 2017–18
| style="text-align:left;"| Kansas
| 39 || 39 || 37.8 || .400 || .406 || .827 || 4.0 || 7.2 || 1.6 || 0.1|| 17.3
|- class="sortbottom"
| style="text-align:center;" colspan="2"| Career
| 142 || 111 || 31.7 || .422 || .409 || .787 || 3.1 || 4.5 || 1.4 || 0.1 || 12.3

References

External links
Kansas Jayhawks bio
Devonte Graham on Twitter

1995 births
Living people
African-American basketball players
All-American college men's basketball players
American men's basketball players
Atlanta Hawks draft picks
Basketball players from Raleigh, North Carolina
Brewster Academy alumni
Charlotte Hornets players
Greensboro Swarm players
Kansas Jayhawks men's basketball players
Medalists at the 2015 Summer Universiade
Needham B. Broughton High School alumni
New Orleans Pelicans players
Point guards
San Antonio Spurs players
Universiade gold medalists for the United States
Universiade medalists in basketball